Cinépolis is a Mexican and international movie theater chain. Its name means City of Cinema and its slogan is La Capital del Cine.

 Cinépolis was the biggest cineplex chain in Mexico, with 427 theaters in 97 cities. It is also the largest chain in Latin America and one of the largest in the world, also owning cinemas in Spain, India, Indonesia, Oman, Bahrain, Saudi Arabia, United Arab Emirates and the United States.

History

Enrique Ramírez Miguel founded Organización Ramírez© in Morelia, Michoacán, Mexico in 1971. Years before, the company opened the first cinema in the city of Salamanca the company was rebranded as Cinematográfica Cadena de Oro, S.A., opening theaters in Acámbaro and Guanajuato. By 1971, the brand had already expanded to Mexico City with the opening of Cine La Raza. In 1972 Cinemas Gemelos was born and one year later the national expansion of Multicinemas began. The company was rebranded in 1994 as Cinépolis with the first multiplex-style theaters in Tijuana. In 1999, Cinépolis VIP was created. It is believed to be the biggest cinema chain in Mexico. In 2019 the brand updated its logo mark and began rolling out the new mark to locations around the world.

Products and services

Luxury cinemas

Cinépolis VIP was created in 1999 and is considered one of the pioneers in the development of the Luxury Cinema concept.

Online ticketing
In 1997, Cineticket was created to give users the option to buy their tickets online instead of waiting to purchase at the venue. Cineticket was the first online theater ticket-selling-system in Mexico.

Premium formats

4DX
On 2 June 2011, Cinépolis invested $25 million and partnered with the South Korean company CJ Group to open 11 4DX theaters throughout Mexico. 4DX features motion seats, wind effects, water and air spray, and odors with over 100 scents. It first opened at the Plaza Acoxpa mall in Mexico City with the release of Disney's Pirates of the Caribbean: On Stranger Tides. On 1 July 2012, Cinépolis opened South America's first 4DX theater in Brazil at the JK Iguatemi shopping mall in São Paulo with the release of Prometheus and Ice Age: Continental Drift. It is the launch customer in the Western Hemisphere and is one of the largest 4DX clients. The technology has expanded throughout Mexico, and has theaters in Chile (Cinépolis Chile), Brazil, Colombia, India, Central America, and the United States.

ScreenX
It was announced on 1 April 2019 that Cinépolis expanded its partnership with the CGV group to bring the first ScreenX theater technology in Mexico, which is a 270-degree, multi-screen theater that allows viewers to experience a film beyond the typical frame of the film's screen. It debuted at the Parque Las Antenas theater in Mexico City on 23 January 2020. It also has one ScreenX location in the United States in San Mateo, California.

4DX Screen
A combination of the conventional ScreenX and the motion-enhanced 4DX theaters, Cinépolis also utilizes the "4DX Screen" (a.k.a. "4DX with ScreenX") theater that includes a fourth ceiling screen and newest 4DX seat versions, first opened at the Parque Toreo theater in Mexico City on 4 March 2020. Introduced in 2017, this marks the merged technology's debut outside the Asia region and overseas.

Markets
Cinépolis has opened theatres in the capitals of Guatemala, El Salvador, Costa Rica, Panama, and Colombia. Cinépolis attempted to expand their business to Ecuador, but failed. So far, 11 theatres have been opened outside Mexico under the Cinépolis brand, with a planned expansion to Peru, with the opening of a fourteen-screen theatre in Lima, a theatre in Cali, Colombia and a third in Tegucigalpa, Honduras.

India

Fun Cinemas is the multiplex cinema chain in India owned by Cinepolis. It is based in Mumbai, and originally established in 2001, by Essel Group. In January 2015, at the time of acquisition by Cinépolis, Fun Cinemas operated 24 multiplexes with 83 screens in India.
Cinépolis has plans to operate 500 screens in India with an investment of ₹ 1,500 crore and has signed deals with 12 developers in eight cities to set up 110 screens in the first phase. There are also plans to enter into deals with developers to create 200 more screens across India by 2010. Cinépolis has locations in India at: Bhubaneswar, Jamshedpur, New Delhi, Thane, Chandigarh, Amritsar, Pune, Bengaluru, Patna, Ahmedabad, Surat, Bhopal, Ludhiana, Navi Mumbai, Mangaluru, Jaipur, Hyderabad, Coimbatore, Hubballi, Vijayawada, Kolkata, Vadodara, Mumbai, Kochi, Guwahati, Muzaffarpur, Gwalior, Lucknow and Chennai. It is also scheduled to open in Ahmedabad (second property), Surat (second property), Calicut, Nagpur, Ghaziabad, Indore and Betul.

Cinépolis has opened the largest Cinépolis Megaplex in Seasons Mall, Pune with 15 screens and another Megaplex at Viviana Mall, Thane with 14 screens with IMAX, 4DX, and Dolby Atmos. Cinepolis Kochi operates 3 VIP screens, first of its kind in India. Cinépolis also has its sub-brand in India known as Cinemastar. It was opened in December 2010 in Thane.

Javier Sotomayor is the Managing Director Asia and Middle East at Cinepolis Corporativo.

Middle East
Ashish Shukla, CEO of Cinépolis Gulf, has revealed plans to expand across the GCC this year, with new cinemas set to open in the UAE, Saudi Arabia, and Oman.

In Bahrain, the cinemas are located at Atrium Mall, Saar, on the left of the King Fahd Causeway. The Cinépolis cinema is ideally placed for Saudi visitors. In Bahrain there are 13-screens, including Bahrain's first Junior theatre and 4D E-motion viewing experience, as well as two large-format screens, MacroXE with Dolby Atmos. Over there Cinépolis promises a unique cinema offering.

The UAE's first Cinepolis megaplex cinema is going to open in Meydan One Mall in Dubai, with both venues set to open in 2020.

United States
Cinépolis USA, which is headquartered in Dallas, Texas began operating luxury theaters in the United States in 2011. In November 2018 it created the Bay Theatre in Pacific Palisades, California, based on an original 1940s design by architect S. Charles Lee as a plush five-screen cinema that features a coastal-themed menu at its concession stand, including an extensive wine list. One auditorium of the new Bay Theatre is equipped with an increasingly rare 35 mm film projector. It will also have a 12-screen luxury movie theater at a new development on the site of the Hollywood Park racetrack in Inglewood, California next to SoFi Stadium. In 2019, it acquired Moviehouse & Eatery to grow its presence in the United States.

On August 9, 2019, Cinepolis reopened its Mansfield, New Jersey location after renovations. It features 13 screens and luxury leather recliners with a full kitchen menu and bar. On January 5, 2020, Cinepolis announced it had closed its theater in Roxbury Township, New Jersey. On July 28, 2021, Cinepolis confirmed it had closed its location in Parsippany, New Jersey.

Indonesia

In October 2018, Cinépolis announced partnership with Cinemaxx, owned by Indonesia's Lippo Group, by acquiring 40% ownership stake. Cinemaxx, at that time, operated 45 theaters with 225 screens. Following the acquisition, Cinépolis opened its first cineplex on 18 September 2019 at Mataram, West Nusa Tenggara followed by the rebranding of all Cinemaxx multiplexes into Cinépolis until Q4 2019.

Foundation
In 2003, Organización Ramírez created the Cinépolis Foundation to help underprivileged people get medical care and education. Its mission is to contribute to social justice in Mexico through visible health programs. In 2007 the foundation was awarded the International Accomplishment in Exhibition for its work in promoting activism within the Mexican community. The Foundation's program, Del Amor Nace la Vista (From love, sight is born) has been recognised as The Best Practice in Social Responsibility. They have signed association deals with twelve organizations in Mexico.

Controversies
In March 2015, an article from the Mexican edition of Forbes magazine revealed that Cinépolis, along with rival movie theater chain Cinemex, were fined $7 million pesos each for directly disobeying instructions by the Intituto Nacional Electoral (INE, National Electoral Institute), by showing political propaganda of the Partido Verde Ecologista de Mexico (Ecologist Green Party of Mexico), with the political party itself being fined $35 million pesos.

In 2017, the Del Amor Nace La Vista charity foundation of Cinépolis was criticized for allegedly leaving 100 Mayan indigenous people blind due to negligence. Cinepolis said it was only two,
and no negligence was detected within the operations.

References

External links 

 
 Cinepolis USA

Cinema chains in Brazil
Cinema chains in Mexico
Online payments
Multinational companies headquartered in Mexico